The IMOCA 60 Class yacht Artemis Ocean Racing Team II, GBR 100 was designed by Jeremy Rogers and launched in the April 2008 after being built Neville Hutton based in Lymington in United Kingdom.

Racing results

References 

Individual sailing vessels
2000s sailing yachts
Sailboat types built in the United Kingdom
Sailboat type designs by Rogers Yacht Design
Vendée Globe boats
IMOCA 60